Edgar Jesus Pereira Oliveira Teixeira (born 1 December 1989) is a former Macanese international footballer.

Career statistics

Club

Notes

International

References

1989 births
Living people
Sportspeople from Santa Maria da Feira
Macau footballers
Macau international footballers
Portuguese footballers
Association football midfielders
C.D. Feirense players
Boavista F.C. players
S.C. Espinho players
S.L. Benfica de Macau players